ONS codes are geocodes maintained by the United Kingdom's Office for National Statistics to represent a wide range of geographical areas of the UK, for use in tabulating census and other statistical data. These codes are also known as GSS codes, where GSS refers to the Government Statistical Service of which ONS is part.

The previous hierarchical system of codes was replaced as from January 2011 by a nine-character code for all types of geography, in which there is no relation between the code for a lower-tier area and the corresponding parent area. The older coding system has now been phased out.

Geography of the UK Census 
Information from the 2011 Census is published for a wide variety of geographical units.  These areas include:

 Counties in England
 Districts within English counties, and Unitary Authority areas served by one council providing district and county functions
 Unitary council areas in Wales, Scotland, and Northern Ireland
 Civil parishes (communities in Wales)
 Electoral wards (called electoral divisions in Wales).  These are the areas defined for the election of local councillors, but are also widely used for presenting statistics at a smaller scale than the whole district.
 Census output areas (OA).  These are the smallest unit for which census data are published - they were initially generated to support publication of 2001 Census outputs and contain at least 40 households and 100 persons, the target size being 125 households.  They were built up from postcode blocks after the census data were available, with the intention of standardising population sizes, geographical shape and social homogeneity (in terms of dwelling types and housing tenure).  The OAs generated in 2001 were retained as far as possible for the publication of outputs from the 2011 Census (less than 3% were changed). Before 2001, census data were published for larger Enumeration Districts (ED) which were delineated before the census was conducted and were the organisational units for census data collection.

Neighbourhood Statistics Geography 

Super Output Areas (SOAs) are a set of geographical areas developed following the 2001 census, initially to facilitate the calculation of the Indices of Deprivation 2004 and subsequently for a range of additional Neighbourhood Statistics (NeSS). The aim was to produce a set of areas of consistent size, whose boundaries would not change (unlike electoral wards), suitable for the publication of data such as the Indices of Deprivation. They are an aggregation of adjacent Output Areas with similar social characteristics. Lower Layer Super Output Areas (LSOAs) typically contain 4 to 6 OAs with a population of around 1500. Middle Layer Super Output Areas (MSOAs) on average have a population of 7,200.  The hierarchy of Output Areas and the two tiers of Super Output Areas have become known as the Neighbourhood Statistics Geography.

MSOAs use the name of the local or unitary authority followed by three digits, for example "Tower Hamlets 022" which is E02000885. LSOAs use the name of the containing MSOA followed by a letter, for example "Tower Hamlets 022C" which is E01004304.

Some LSOAs and MSOAs were revised in alignment with the 2021 Census.

Former hierarchical coding system 
The older ONS code was constructed top down: 
A two-character code represented an administrative county.
For example, 12 for Cambridgeshire.
A four-character code represented a district, so that the first two characters showed the county in which the district was placed.
For example, 12UB for Cambridge district or  12UD for Fenland.
In the case of a unitary authority (including metropolitan and London boroughs) the first two digits were 00.
For example,  00AL for Greenwich (London Borough) or 00EC for Middlesbrough.
Local Government wards were given a two-letter code within their local authority.
For example, 12UBGA for Petersfield Ward within Cambridge district.  
The smallest level, Census OAs were originally given  an additional 4 digits within a ward, so that the first output area in Petersfield Ward was coded 12UBGA0001.
Civil parishes were also coded using this hierarchical system.  Parishes were coded using an additional 3 digits after their local authority.  For example, within 12UD for Fenland district, the parish of Tydd St. Giles was coded 12UD010.

Current GSS coding system 
The current system replaces these codes with a fixed length code of nine characters.  The first three characters indicate the level of geography and the six digits following define the individual unit.  For example, the Royal Borough of Greenwich is coded as E09000011, Middlesbrough is E06000002, Cambridge E07000008 and Fenland E07000010.

The meaning of some common three character prefixes is as follows:

In 2019, the House of Commons Library proposed names instead of numeric codes for MSOAs to make them easier to use.

Nine-character GSS codes 
A full and up-to-date listing of GSS names and codes may be found by following the link to ONS Geography's Code History Database, below.

See also 
Geodemographic segmentation
ONS Open Geography Portal

References

External links 
 ONS Beginners' Guide to UK Geography
 Open Geography portal
 Code History Database downloads (2017 onwards)
  Mapit - shows ONS boundaries for any postcode

Geocodes
2011 United Kingdom census
Office for National Statistics